Phytoplankton are the autotrophic (self-feeding) components of the plankton community and a key part of ocean and freshwater ecosystems.

Phytoplankton obtain their energy through photosynthesis, as do trees and other plants on land. This means phytoplankton must have light from the sun, so they live in the well-lit surface layers (euphotic zone) of oceans and lakes. In comparison with terrestrial plants, phytoplankton are distributed over a larger surface area, are exposed to less seasonal variation and have markedly faster turnover rates than trees (days versus decades). As a result, phytoplankton respond rapidly on a global scale to climate variations.

Phytoplankton form the base of marine and freshwater food webs and are key players in the global carbon cycle. They account for about half of global photosynthetic activity and at least half of the oxygen production, despite amounting to only about 1% of the global plant biomass. Phytoplankton are very diverse, varying from photosynthesizing bacteria to plant-like algae to armour-plated coccolithophores. Important groups of phytoplankton include the diatoms, cyanobacteria and dinoflagellates, although many other groups are represented.

Most phytoplankton are too small to be individually seen with the unaided eye. However, when present in high enough numbers, some varieties may be noticeable as colored patches on the water surface due to the presence of chlorophyll within their cells and accessory pigments (such as phycobiliproteins or xanthophylls) in some species.

Types
[[File:Phytoplankton types.jpg|thumb|upright=3.3| {{center|Some types of phytoplankton (not to scale)'Left to right: cyanobacteria, diatom, dinoflagellate, green algae and coccolithophore}}]]

Phytoplankton are photosynthesizing microscopic protists and bacteria that inhabit the upper sunlit layer of marine and fresh water bodies of water on Earth. Paralleling plants on land, phytoplankton undertake primary production in water, creating organic compounds from carbon dioxide dissolved in the water. Phytoplankton form the base of — and sustain — the aquatic food web, and are crucial players in the Earth's carbon cycle.

"Marine photosynthesis is dominated by microalgae, which together with cyanobacteria, are collectively called phytoplankton." Phytoplankton are extremely diverse, varying from photosynthesizing bacteria (cyanobacteria), to plant-like diatoms, to armour-plated coccolithophores.

 Ecology 

Phytoplankton obtain energy through the process of photosynthesis and must therefore live in the well-lit surface layer (termed the euphotic zone) of an ocean, sea, lake, or other body of water. Phytoplankton account for about half of all photosynthetic activity on Earth."NASA Satellite Detects Red Glow to Map Global Ocean Plant Health" NASA, 28 May 2009. Their cumulative energy fixation in carbon compounds (primary production) is the basis for the vast majority of oceanic and also many freshwater food webs (chemosynthesis is a notable exception).

While almost all phytoplankton species are obligate photoautotrophs, there are some that are mixotrophic and other, non-pigmented species that are actually heterotrophic (the latter are often viewed as zooplankton). Of these, the best known are dinoflagellate genera such as Noctiluca and Dinophysis, that obtain organic carbon by ingesting other organisms or detrital material.

Phytoplankton live in the photic zone of the ocean, where photosynthesis is possible. During photosynthesis, they assimilate carbon dioxide and release oxygen. If solar radiation is too high, phytoplankton may fall victim to photodegradation. Phytoplankton species feature a large variety of photosynthetic pigments which species-specifically enables them to absorb different wavelengths of the variable underwater light. This implies different species can use the wavelength of light different efficiently and the light is not a single ecological resource but a multitude of resources depending on its spectral composition. By that it was found that changes in the spectrum of light alone can alter natural phytoplankton communities even if the same intensity is available. For growth, phytoplankton cells additionally depend on nutrients, which enter the ocean by rivers, continental weathering, and glacial ice meltwater on the poles. Phytoplankton release dissolved organic carbon (DOC) into the ocean. Since phytoplankton are the basis of marine food webs, they serve as prey for zooplankton, fish larvae and other heterotrophic organisms. They can also be degraded by bacteria or by viral lysis. Although some phytoplankton cells, such as dinoflagellates, are able to migrate vertically, they are still incapable of actively moving against currents, so they slowly sink and ultimately fertilize the seafloor with dead cells and detritus.

Phytoplankton are crucially dependent on minerals. These are primarily macronutrients such as nitrate, phosphate or silicic acid, whose availability is governed by the balance between the so-called biological pump and upwelling of deep, nutrient-rich waters. Phytoplankton nutrient composition drives and is driven by the Redfield ratio of macronutrients generally available throughout the surface oceans. However, across large areas of the oceans such as the Southern Ocean, phytoplankton are limited by the lack of the micronutrient iron. This has led to some scientists advocating iron fertilization as a means to counteract the accumulation of human-produced carbon dioxide (CO2) in the atmosphere. Large-scale experiments have added iron (usually as salts such as ferrous sulfate) to the oceans to promote phytoplankton growth and draw atmospheric CO2 into the ocean. Controversy about manipulating the ecosystem and the efficiency of iron fertilization has slowed such experiments.

Phytoplankton depend on B vitamins for survival. Areas in the ocean have been identified as having a major lack of some B Vitamins, and correspondingly, phytoplankton.

The effects of anthropogenic warming on the global population of phytoplankton is an area of active research. Changes in the vertical stratification of the water column, the rate of temperature-dependent biological reactions, and the atmospheric supply of nutrients are expected to have important effects on future phytoplankton productivity.

The effects of anthropogenic ocean acidification on phytoplankton growth and community structure has also received considerable attention. The cells of coccolithophore phytoplankton are typically covered in a calcium carbonate shell called a coccosphere that is sensitive to ocean acidification. Because of their short generation times, evidence suggests some phytoplankton can adapt to changes in pH induced by increased carbon dioxide on rapid time-scales (months to years).

Phytoplankton serve as the base of the aquatic food web, providing an essential ecological function for all aquatic life. Under future conditions of anthropogenic warming and ocean acidification, changes in phytoplankton mortality due to changes in rates of zooplankton grazing may be significant. One of the many food chains in the ocean – remarkable due to the small number of links – is that of phytoplankton sustaining krill (a crustacean similar to a tiny shrimp), which in turn sustain baleen whales.

The El Niño-Southern Oscillation (ENSO) cycles in the Equatorial Pacific area can affect phytoplankton. Biochemical and physical changes during ENSO cycles modify the phytoplankton community structure. Also, changes in the structure of the phytoplankton, such as a significant reduction in biomass and phytoplankton density, particularly during El Nino phases can occur. The sensitivity of phytoplankton to environmental changes is why they is often used as indicators of estuarine and coastal ecological condition and health. To study these events satellite ocean color observations are used to observe these changes. Satellite images help to have a better view of their global distribution.

Diversity

The term phytoplankton encompasses all photoautotrophic microorganisms in aquatic food webs. However, unlike terrestrial communities, where most autotrophs are plants, phytoplankton are a diverse group, incorporating protistan eukaryotes and both eubacterial and archaebacterial prokaryotes. There are about 5,000 known species of marine phytoplankton. How such diversity evolved despite scarce resources (restricting niche differentiation) is unclear.

In terms of numbers, the most important groups of phytoplankton include the diatoms, cyanobacteria and dinoflagellates, although many other groups of algae are represented. One group, the coccolithophorids, is responsible (in part) for the release of significant amounts of dimethyl sulfide (DMS) into the atmosphere. DMS is oxidized to form sulfate which, in areas where ambient aerosol particle concentrations are low, can contribute to the population of cloud condensation nuclei, mostly leading to increased cloud cover and cloud albedo according to the so-called CLAW hypothesis. Different types of phytoplankton support different trophic levels within varying ecosystems. In oligotrophic oceanic regions such as the Sargasso Sea or the South Pacific Gyre, phytoplankton is dominated by the small sized cells, called picoplankton and nanoplankton (also referred to as picoflagellates and nanoflagellates), mostly composed of cyanobacteria (Prochlorococcus, Synechococcus) and picoeucaryotes such as Micromonas''. Within more productive ecosystems, dominated by upwelling or high terrestrial inputs, larger dinoflagellates are the more dominant phytoplankton and reflect a larger portion of the biomass.

Growth strategies 
In the early twentieth century, Alfred C. Redfield found the similarity of the phytoplankton's elemental composition to the major dissolved nutrients in the deep ocean. Redfield proposed that the ratio of carbon to nitrogen to phosphorus (106:16:1) in the ocean was controlled by the phytoplankton's requirements, as phytoplankton subsequently release nitrogen and phosphorus as they are remineralized. This so-called "Redfield ratio" in describing stoichiometry of phytoplankton and seawater has become a fundamental principle to understand marine ecology, biogeochemistry and phytoplankton evolution. However, the Redfield ratio is not a universal value and it may diverge due to the changes in exogenous nutrient delivery and microbial metabolisms in the ocean, such as nitrogen fixation, denitrification and anammox.

The dynamic stoichiometry shown in unicellular algae reflects their capability to store nutrients in an internal pool, shift between enzymes with various nutrient requirements and alter osmolyte composition. Different cellular components have their own unique stoichiometry characteristics, for instance, resource (light or nutrients) acquisition machinery such as proteins and chlorophyll contain a high concentration of nitrogen but low in phosphorus. Meanwhile, growth machinery such as ribosomal RNA contains high nitrogen and phosphorus concentrations.

Based on allocation of resources, phytoplankton is classified into three different growth strategies, namely survivalist, bloomer and generalist. Survivalist phytoplankton has a high ratio of N:P (>30) and contains an abundance of resource-acquisition machinery to sustain growth under scarce resources. Bloomer phytoplankton has a low N:P ratio (<10), contains a high proportion of growth machinery, and is adapted to exponential growth. Generalist phytoplankton has similar N:P to the Redfield ratio and contain relatively equal resource-acquisition and growth machinery.

Factors affecting abundance
The NAAMES study was a five-year scientific research program conducted between 2015 and 2019 by scientists from Oregon State University and NASA to investigated aspects of phytoplankton dynamics in ocean ecosystems, and how such dynamics influence atmospheric aerosols, clouds, and climate (NAAMES stands for the North Atlantic Aerosols and Marine Ecosystems Study). The study focused on the sub-arctic region of the North Atlantic Ocean, which is the site of one of Earth's largest recurring phytoplankton blooms. The long history of research in this location, as well as relative ease of accessibility, made the North Atlantic an ideal location to test prevailing scientific hypotheses in an effort to better understand the role of phytoplankton aerosol emissions on Earth's energy budget.

NAAMES was designed to target specific phases of the annual phytoplankton cycle: minimum, climax and the intermediary decreasing and increasing biomass, in order to resolve debates on the timing of bloom formations and the patterns driving annual bloom re-creation. The NAAMES project also investigated the quantity, size, and composition of aerosols generated by primary production in order to understand how phytoplankton bloom cycles affect cloud formations and climate.

Factors affecting productivity

Phytoplankton are the key mediators of the biological pump. Understanding the response of phytoplankton to changing environmental conditions is a prerequisite to predict future atmospheric concentrations of CO2. Temperature, irradiance and nutrient concentrations, along with CO2 are the chief environmental factors that influence the physiology and stoichiometry of phytoplankton. The stoichiometry or elemental composition of phytoplankton is of utmost importance to secondary producers such as copepods, fish and shrimp, because it determines the nutritional quality and influences energy flow through the marine food chains. Climate change may greatly restructure phytoplankton communities leading to cascading consequences for marine food webs, thereby altering the amount of carbon transported to the ocean interior.

The diagram on the right gives an overview of the various environmental factors that together affect phytoplankton productivity. All of these factors are expected to undergo significant changes in the future ocean due to global change. Global warming simulations predict oceanic temperature increase; dramatic changes in oceanic stratification, circulation and changes in cloud cover and sea ice, resulting in an increased light supply to the ocean surface. Also, reduced nutrient supply is predicted to co-occur with ocean acidification and warming, due to increased stratification of the water column and reduced mixing of nutrients from the deep water to the surface.

Role of phytoplankton

In the diagram on the right, the compartments influenced by phytoplankton include the atmospheric gas composition, inorganic nutrients, and trace element fluxes as well as the transfer and cycling of organic matter via biological processes. The photosynthetically fixed carbon is rapidly recycled and reused in the surface ocean, while a certain fraction of this biomass is exported as sinking particles to the deep ocean, where it is subject to ongoing transformation processes, e.g., remineralization.

Phytoplankton contribute to not only a basic pelagic marine food web but also to the microbial loop. Phytoplankton are the base of the marine food web and because they don't rely on other organisms for food, they make up the first trophic level. Organisms such as zooplankton feed of these phytoplankton which are fed on by other organisms and so forth until the fourth trophic level is reached with apex predators. Approximately 90% of total carbon is lost between trophic levels due to respiration, detritus, and dissolved organic matter. This makes the remineralization process and nutrient cycling performed by phytoplankton and bacteria important in maintaining efficiency.

Phytoplankton blooms in which a species increases rapidly under conditions favorable to growth can produce harmful algal blooms (HABs).

Aquaculture 

Phytoplankton are a key food item in both aquaculture and mariculture. Both utilize phytoplankton as food for the animals being farmed. In mariculture, the phytoplankton is naturally occurring and is introduced into enclosures with the normal circulation of seawater. In aquaculture, phytoplankton must be obtained and introduced directly. The plankton can either be collected from a body of water or cultured, though the former method is seldom used. Phytoplankton is used as a foodstock for the production of rotifers, which are in turn used to feed other organisms. Phytoplankton is also used to feed many varieties of aquacultured molluscs, including pearl oysters and giant clams. A 2018 study estimated the nutritional value of natural phytoplankton in terms of carbohydrate, protein and lipid across the world ocean using ocean-colour data from satellites, and found the calorific value of phytoplankton to vary considerably across different oceanic regions and between different time of the year.

The production of phytoplankton under artificial conditions is itself a form of aquaculture. Phytoplankton is cultured for a variety of purposes, including foodstock for other aquacultured organisms, a nutritional supplement for captive invertebrates in aquaria. Culture sizes range from small-scale laboratory cultures of less than 1L to several tens of thousands of litres for commercial aquaculture. Regardless of the size of the culture, certain conditions must be provided for efficient growth of plankton. The majority of cultured plankton is marine, and seawater of a specific gravity of 1.010 to 1.026 may be used as a culture medium. This water must be sterilized, usually by either high temperatures in an autoclave or by exposure to ultraviolet radiation, to prevent biological contamination of the culture. Various fertilizers are added to the culture medium to facilitate the growth of plankton. A culture must be aerated or agitated in some way to keep plankton suspended, as well as to provide dissolved carbon dioxide for photosynthesis. In addition to constant aeration, most cultures are manually mixed or stirred on a regular basis. Light must be provided for the growth of phytoplankton. The colour temperature of illumination should be approximately 6,500 K, but values from 4,000 K to upwards of 20,000 K have been used successfully. The duration of light exposure should be approximately 16 hours daily; this is the most efficient artificial day length.

Anthropogenic changes

Marine phytoplankton perform half of the global photosynthetic CO2 fixation (net global primary production of ~50 Pg C per year) and half of the oxygen production despite amounting to only ~1% of global plant biomass. In comparison with terrestrial plants, marine phytoplankton are distributed over a larger surface area, are exposed to less seasonal variation and have markedly faster turnover rates than trees (days versus decades). Therefore, phytoplankton respond rapidly on a global scale to climate variations. These characteristics are important when one is evaluating the contributions of phytoplankton to carbon fixation and forecasting how this production may change in response to perturbations. Predicting the effects of climate change on primary productivity is complicated by phytoplankton bloom cycles that are affected by both bottom-up control (for example, availability of essential nutrients and vertical mixing) and top-down control (for example, grazing and viruses). Increases in solar radiation, temperature and freshwater inputs to surface waters strengthen ocean stratification and consequently reduce transport of nutrients from deep water to surface waters, which reduces primary productivity. Conversely, rising CO2 levels can increase phytoplankton primary production, but only when nutrients are not limiting.

Some studies indicate that overall global oceanic phytoplankton density has decreased in the past century, but these conclusions have been questioned because of the limited availability of long-term phytoplankton data, methodological differences in data generation and the large annual and decadal variability in phytoplankton production. Moreover, other studies suggest a global increase in oceanic phytoplankton production and changes in specific regions or specific phytoplankton groups. The global Sea Ice Index is declining, leading to higher light penetration and potentially more primary production; however, there are conflicting predictions for the effects of variable mixing patterns and changes in nutrient supply and for productivity trends in polar zones.

The effect of human-caused climate change on phytoplankton biodiversity is not well understood. Should greenhouse gas emissions continue rising to high levels by 2100, some phytoplankton models predict an increase in species richness, or the number of different species within a given area. This increase in plankton diversity is traced to warming ocean temperatures. In addition to species richness changes, the locations where phytoplankton are distributed are expected to shift towards the Earth's poles. Such movement may disrupt ecosystems, because phytoplankton are consumed by zooplankton, which in turn sustain fisheries. This shift in phytoplankton location may also diminish the ability of phytoplankton to store carbon that was emitted by human activities. Human (anthropogenic) changes to phytoplankton impact both natural and economic processes.

See also 

 
 
 
 
 
 Critical depth
 Deep chlorophyll maximum
 
 
  (microalgae)
 NAAMES

References

Further reading

External links 
 Secchi Disk and Secchi app, a citizen science project to study the phytoplankton
 Ocean Drifters, a short film narrated by David Attenborough about the varied roles of plankton
 Plankton Chronicles, a short documentary films & photos
 DMS and Climate, NOAA
 Plankton*Net, images of planktonic species

Aquatic ecology
Biological oceanography
Planktology